Safura is a given name. Notable people with the name include:

Safura Alizadeh (born 1992), Azerbaijani singer
Safura Begum (born 1959), Bangladeshi politician